Wilhelm Fleischer (born 14 May 1936) is a Romanian equestrian. He competed in two events at the 1960 Summer Olympics.

References

External links
 

1936 births
Living people
Romanian male equestrians
Olympic equestrians of Romania
Equestrians at the 1960 Summer Olympics
Sportspeople from Sibiu